Amata discata is a moth of the family Erebidae. It was described by Herbert Druce in 1898. It is found in Tanzania.

References

 

Endemic fauna of Tanzania
discata
Moths described in 1898
Moths of Africa